Sporophila is a genus of Neotropical birds in the tanager family Thraupidae. The genus now includes the six seed finches that were previously placed in the genus Oryzoborus.

They are relatively small with stubby, conical bills adapted for feeding on seeds and alike. Most species are strongly sexually dimorphic, and while "typical" adult males often are distinctive, female and immatures of both sexes can be very difficult (in some species virtually impossible) to identify to exact species. Females of at least some of these species have different ultraviolet colours, which can be seen by birds, but not humans. Female-like (paedomorphic) males apparently also occur, at least in some species.

Taxonomy and species list
The genus Spermophila was introduced by the English naturalist William John Swainson in 1827. The type species was subsequently designated as Temminck's seedeater (Sporophila falcirostris) by George Robert Gray in 1841. As the genus name Spermophila had been introduced by John Richardson in 1825 for a genus of mammals, the German ornithologist Jean Cabanis coined the present name Sporophila as a replacement in 1844. The name combines the Ancient Greek  meaning "seed" and  meaning "-loving".

The genus now includes the six seed finches that were previously placed in Oryzoborus as well as the thick-billed seed finch that was the only species in Dolospingus. A molecular phylogenetic study published in 2014 found that these seven species were embedded in Sporophila.

The genus contains 40 species:

Described in 2016 and not yet generally recognised:
 Ibera seedeater, Sporophila iberaensis

Possible extinct species:
 Hooded seedeater, Sporophila melanops – possibly extinct (20th century?), a hybrid or a color morph of S. nigricollis

References

 Lijtmaer, D. A., N. M. Sharpe, P. L. Tubaro & S. C. Lougheed. 2004. Molecular phylogenetics and diversification of the genus Sporophila (Aves: Passeriformes). Mol. Philo. Evol. 33:562-579.
 Robbins, M. B., M. J. Braun, C. J. Huddleston, D. W. Finch, & C. M. Milensky (2005). First Guyana records, natural history, and systematics of the White-winged Seedeater (Dolospingus fringilloides). Ibis 147:334-341.

External links

 
Taxonomy articles created by Polbot
Bird genera
Taxa named by Jean Cabanis